The plain-crested elaenia (Elaenia cristata) is a species of bird in the family Tyrannidae. It is found in Bolivia, Brazil, Colombia, French Guiana, Guyana, Peru, Suriname, and Venezuela.

Its natural habitats are dry savanna, subtropical or tropical dry shrubland, and subtropical or tropical seasonally wet or flooded lowland grassland.

Subspecies 
Two subspecies are recognized:
 Elaenia cristata alticola – Zimmer & Phelps Sr., 1946: found in Venezuela and the Guianas through Brazil to southeastern Peru and Bolivia
 Elaenia cristata cristata – Pelzeln, 1868: the nominate subspecies, found in Venezuela and the Guianas through Brazil to southeastern Peru and Bolivia

References

plain-crested elaenia
Birds of the Guianas
Birds of Brazil
plain-crested elaenia
plain-crested elaenia
Birds of the Amazon Basin
Taxonomy articles created by Polbot